Mikako (written: 美佳子, 美香子, 実日子, 実加子, 未華子, みかこ or 未可子) is a feminine Japanese given name. Notable people with the name include:

 Mikako, a member of five-girl J-pop girl group Faky
, Japanese actress and model
, Japanese handball player
, Japanese voice actress
, Japanese voice actress
, Japanese synchronized swimmer
, Japanese actress
, Japanese voice actress and singer

Fictional characters
, a character in the manga series Sora no Otoshimono
Mikako Minamino, a character in the AKB0048
 Mikako Kurokawa, the Ultimate Exorcist from Danganronpa Another Despair Academy

Japanese feminine given names